Cropped Out is an annual multi-venue music festival held in Louisville, Kentucky, co-founded in 2010 by Ryan Davis and James Ardery. According to the festival's website, "Cropped Out aims to celebrate a select fistful of contemporary musicians, artists, and artisans whom we feel reflect a greater undercurrent of sonic, visual, and conceptual exploration. It is our intention to turn heads toward the talents of those often omitted, overlooked, or cropped out of 'the big picture'. These are the minds most interesting to us, the minds most capable of emerging from and quickly returning to their lightlessness, if only to be briefly met by a niche appreciation...The fest is designed to highlight the creative efforts of Louisville natives, friends, family, and fellow thinkers from Nashville to Chicago to Brooklyn and beyond." The festival stays true to this ethos, presenting independent bands and a general DIY scene in an intimate, affordable setting. The primary genres featured in the festival are Indie rock and post-punk, but expands into other genres such as folk, avant-garde, free jazz, hardcore punk, noise rock and even hip-hop and alternative country. Cropped Out has close ties with Drag City Records, Thrill Jockey Records, Sophomore Lounge among other independent labels.

The inaugural festival was held in October 2010 both at Kingfish and American Turners Louisville, both located on the banks of the Ohio River just east of downtown Louisville. During the first year, the festival was staffed primarily by the two organizers and their parents, along with a group of close friends. The second year of the festival was held at a warehouse space in the NuLu which was nicknamed "The Crummy Den" by festival organizers. Due to noise complaints on the final night of the festival, the Louisville Police Department interrupted and cut Scratch Acid's set short.

Since 2012, the main part of the festival has taken place at American Turners Louisville, often with Thursday opening and Sunday closing parties held at different local bars and venues. Since 2013,  on-site camping has been available to ticket holders for a camping fee. Since 2016, Cropped Out has partnered with Against the Grain Brewery in Louisville to produce Hopped Out, the official beer of Cropped Out. Notably, on the emphasis of local artists, Cropped Out has hosted rare performances by Louisville bands and musicians such as Papa M, The Endtables, Bonnie 'Prince' Billy (performing Superwolf with Matt Sweeney), The Belgian Waffles! and more.

Cropped Out lineups by year

Cropped Out VIII
The 2018 edition of Cropped Out took place October 5 and 6 at American Turners Louisville.

Friday, October 5
 Bill Direen
 Bill Mackay / Nathan Bowles
 Charalambides
 Circuit Des Yeux
 Drunks With Guns
 Exek
 Exit III
 Honey
 Iron Bars
 Leggy
 Major Stars
 Michael Hurley
 Night Vapor
 Simon Joyner
 Spider Bags
 Taiwan Housing Project
 The Sal Show
 Träd, Gräs & Stenar
Saturday, October 6
 Anthony Braxton / Jacqueline Kerrod
 Catherine Irwin
 Cherry Death
 Endless Boogie
 Equipment Pointed Ankh
 Footings
 Graham Lambkin / Bill Nace
 Half Japanese
 Jana Rush
 Kal Marks
 Lié
 Protruders
 Quin Kirchner Group
 Sadie
 Sex Tide
 Shabazz Palaces
 Thee Open Sex
 The Possum
 The Web
 The World
 Tommy Wright III
 Winger Brothers

Cropped Out VII
The 2017 edition of Cropped Out took place September 22 & 23, 2017 at American Turners Louisville. A kick-off party is scheduled to take place September 21, 2017 at Nachbar, and a closing party is scheduled to take place September 24, 2017 at Kaiju.

Thursday, September 21 @ Nachbar
 Fever Hands
 King Cheetah
 Shawnthany Calypso
Friday, September 22 @ American Turners
 75 Dollar Bill
 Axis: Sova
 Bathroom Laws
 Circle X
 Crazy Doberman
 Dan Melchior
 Exacta Cube
 Heavy Dreams
 John Bender
 Limes
 Lung
 Neil Hamburger
 Pile
 Royal Trux
 The Cowboys
 The Stranger
 Tommy Jay's Latest Freak Show
 Wombo
Saturday, September 23 @ American Turners
 Attic Talent
 Billington / Shippy / Wyche
 David Nance
 Deep State
 Feedtime
 Frank Hurricane
 Fried Egg
 Le Fruit Vert
 Magik Markers
 Matt Jencik
 Peter Brötzmann
 Rays
 Sadat X
 Sarah Squirm
 Shit and Shine
 Shutaro Noguchi
 Tara Jane O'Neil
 Tashi Dorji & Tyler Damon
 The Other Years
 Tyvek
Sunday, September 24 @ American Turners
 Axel Cooper
 Jaye Jayle
 Justin Frye of PC Worship
 Mike Donovan of Peacers / Sic Alps
 Natural Man

Cropped Out VI

The 2016 edition of Cropped Out took place on September 23 & 24, 2016 at American Turners after a year-long hiatus, due largely to both Tropical Trash and State Champion (two bands that are composed mainly of the festival's organizers and staff) going on tours around the same time that year. The kick-off party took place at Nachbar in Louisville on September 22, and the closing party took place at Kaiju on September 25.

Thursday, September 22 @ Nachbar (Kickoff Party)

Friday, September 23 @ American Turners

Saturday, September 24 @ American Turner's

Sunday, September 25 @ Kaiju

Cropped Out V
The 2014 edition took place from September 26 to September 28, 2014 at Dreamland Film Center, American Turners Louisville, and Fresh Start.

Thursday, September 25 @ Dreamland Film Center (Kickoff Party)

Friday, September 26 @ American Turners

Saturday, September 27 @ American Turners

Sunday, September 28 @ Fresh Start Grower Supply

Cropped Out IV
The 2013 edition of Cropped Out took place entirely at American Turners from Friday, September 27 to Sunday, September 29, 2013.

Friday, September 27 @ American Turners

Saturday, September 28 @ American Turners

Sunday, September 29 @ American Turners

The Sunday show was originally intended to be held at the Workhouse Ballroom but was moved to the Phreedom Hall stage at American Turners. Tony Clifton was also scheduled to perform as the host for the main part of the festival at American Turners but ultimately cancelled due to personal reasons.

Cropped Out III
The 2012 edition took place at American Turners and the Workhouse Ballroom, a small cave near the Highlands area of Louisville, from Friday, September 28 to Sunday, September 30, 2012.

Friday, September 28 @ American Turners

Dahm Cipolla of The Phantom Family Halo was intended to play but cancelled due to illness. He was replaced by Virginia grindcore band Suppression.

Saturday, September 29 @ American Turners

Sunday, September 30 @ The Workhouse Ballroom

Cropped Out II
The 2011 edition took place entirely at The Crummy Den, a warehouse space that was turned into a DIY venue for the weekend, and took place from Friday, September 27 to Sunday, September 29, 2011.

Friday, November 11

Saturday, November 12

Sunday, November 1

Cropped Out I
The 2010 Edition took place at KingFish and American Turners Louisville from October 1 to October 3, 2010.

Friday, October 1 @ KingFish

Saturday, October 2 @ American Turners

Sunday, October 3 @ American Turners

See also
 List of attractions and events in the Louisville metropolitan area

References

External links
 Cropped Out's official website
 The site of Cropped Out

Music festivals in Kentucky
Rock festivals in the United States
Festivals in Louisville, Kentucky
Indie rock festivals
Music festivals established in 2010
2010 establishments in Kentucky